Ilir Dibra (born 16 August 1977) is an Albanian retired footballer who won a league title with Vllaznia Shkodër.

International career
He made his debut for Albania in a February 2000 Malta International Football Tournament match against Azerbaijan and earned a total of 2 caps, scoring no goals. His final international was in the same month at the same tournament against Malta.

Honours
Albanian Superliga: 1
 1998

References

External links
 

1977 births
Living people
Albanian footballers
Association football defenders
Albania international footballers
KF Vllaznia Shkodër players
KF Bylis Ballsh players
KF Apolonia Fier players
Flamurtari Vlorë players
KS Lushnja players
KF Teuta Durrës players
Luftëtari Gjirokastër players